Nurse Jackie is an American medical comedy-drama television series. It premiered on Showtime on June 8, 2009, and its seventh and final season premiered on April 12, 2015. The series finale aired on June 28, 2015.

The show stars Edie Falco as the title character, Jackie Peyton, an emergency department nurse at All Saints' Hospital in New York City. For Jackie, "every day is a high wire act of juggling patients, doctors, fellow nurses, and her own indiscretions."

The show was well-received by critics, winning five Primetime Emmy Awards out of 24 nominations, including one win for Falco and Merritt Wever each.

Development and production
Nurse Jackie was created by Liz Brixius, Linda Wallem, and Evan Dunsky. Brixius and Wallem served as showrunners for the first four seasons and shared executive producer duties with Caryn Mandabach and John Melfi. Showtime ordered an initial 12 episodes. Before the premiere, Brixius told the New York Daily News that "Guys' stories tend to be about conquests—getting the job, winning the Olympics, whatever. Women['s] stories aren't as immediately climactic so they need to play out over the course of three months ... And every medical show out there has been about doctors. Doctors are absolutely unable to do what they have to do without nurses. We want to tell those stories."

The June 8, 2009, series premiere was Showtime's most successful ever, with 1 million viewers for the premiere and over 350,000 for the repeat broadcast. Showtime immediately picked up the series for a second season. Season Three premiered on Showtime on March 28, 2011. On May 23, 2011, Showtime ordered a fourth season. A fifth season was ordered on May 31, 2012, and production began in late 2012. The season 4 finale aired on June 17, 2012. Season 5 premiered on April 14, 2013, with new showrunner and executive producer, Clyde Phillips. On June 6, 2013, Showtime renewed the show for a sixth season, which premiered on April 13, 2014.

On March 31, 2014, Showtime renewed Nurse Jackie for a seventh season, which was announced in September as the show's final season. It premiered April 12, 2015.

Cast and characters
Showtime called Jackie Peyton a "strong-willed, iconoclastic New York City nurse juggling the frenzied grind of an urban hospital and an equally challenging personal life," noting that she had "an occasional weakness for Vicodin, Percocet, and Xanax to get her through the days." The main characters include Dr. Eleanor O'Hara (Eve Best), a British doctor and Jackie's best friend at work; Zoey Barkow (Merritt Wever), a spunky, inexperienced nursing student from a community college, "the perfect foil for Jackie's sharp angles"; Dr. Fitch Cooper (Peter Facinelli), "a likable 'golden boy' whose calm façade hides a nervous disposition"; and Eddie Walzer (Paul Schulze), a pharmacist with whom Jackie is having an affair at the beginning of the series.

Other characters include the officious hospital administrator Gloria Akalitus (Anna Deavere Smith), Jackie's bar owner husband Kevin (Dominic Fumusa), their daughters Grace (Ruby Jerins) and Fiona (Daisy Tahan in season 1 and Mackenzie Aladjem in seasons 2 through 7), and Thor (Stephen Wallem), Jackie's kindhearted confidant and the real-life brother of show creator/executive producer Linda Wallem.

Main

 Edie Falco as Jackie Peyton, RN; a senior ER nurse
 Eve Best as Eleanor O'Hara, MD; an ER surgeon, later Chief of Emergency Medicine
 Merritt Wever as Zoey Barkow, RN; an ER nurse, later ER charge-nurse
 Haaz Sleiman as Mohammed de la Cruz, RN; an ER nurse
 Paul Schulze as Eddie Walzer, PharmD.; the ER pharmacist
 Peter Facinelli as Fitch "Coop" Cooper, MD; an ER physician
 Dominic Fumusa as Kevin Peyton; Jackie's husband
 Anna Deavere Smith as Gloria Akalitus, RN; the ER administrator
 Ruby Jerins as Grace Peyton; Jackie's elder daughter
 Daisy Tahan (season 1) and Mackenzie Aladjem (season 2–7) as Fiona Peyton; Jackie's younger daughter
 Bobby Cannavale as Miguel Cruz, MD
 Morris Chestnut as Ike Prentiss, MD; a trauma surgeon and the Chief of Emergency Medicine
 Stephen Wallem as Thor Lundgren, RN; an ER nurse
 Betty Gilpin as Carrie Roman, MD; an ER physician
 Adam Ferrara as Frank Verelli; an NYPD Sergeant

Recurring cast
Rene Ifrah as Officer Ryan (seasons 1–3)
 Arjun Gupta as Sam (seasons 1–4)
 Lenny Jacobson as Lenny (seasons 1–4)
 Michael Buscemi as God (seasons 1–4, 7)
 Jaimie Alexander as Tunie Peyton (season 3)
 Gbenga Akinnagbe as Kelly Slater (seasons 3–4)
 Jake Cannavale as Charlie Cruz (season 4)
 Marcy Harriell as Marta (season 5)
 Laura Benanti as Mia Peyton (season 6)
 Julie White as Antoinette Mills (season 6)
 Michael Esper as Gabe (season 6–7)
 Tony Shalhoub as Bernard Prince, MD (season 7)
 Jeremy Shamos as Johanes Karlsen (season 7)
 Mark Feuerstein as Barry Wolfe (season 7)

Episodes

Reception

Critical reception
The premiere of Nurse Jackie was met with generally positive reviews from critics, and received a Metacritic rating of 76 out of 100. Entertainment Weekly gave the first episode a B+, stating "Edie Falco brings a genial forcefulness to Nurse Jackie." New York magazine called the Showtime series "smart, acrid, alternately sharp and sentimental" and "the best series yet in the cable channel's ongoing meditation on the nature of addiction ... and the setting for a truly breakthrough female character." James Poniewozik from Time magazine ranked Nurse Jackies episode "Tiny Bubbles" (106) as 5th on his Top 10 Episodes of 2009 list.  Variety and Salon struck the primary sour notes, with Variety noting, "The series increasingly feels like all style and limited substance – a star showcase that's less 'triumphant return' than 'Nice to have you back, but...'"

Reviews of subsequent seasons varied. The second season achieved a Metacritic rating of 75 out of 100 from 16 critics, the third season received 79 out of 100 based on 7 reviews, the fourth received 83 out of 100 out of 9 reviews, the fifth season received a  66 out of 100 based on 10 reviews, and the sixth season received a rating of 64 out of 100 based on 4 reviews.  The seventh and final season did not receive enough ratings to warrant a score.

Controversy
Soon after Nurse Jackie premiered, the New York State Nurses Association decried the unethical behavior of the title character, and the detrimental impression regarding nurses that such a portrayal could have on the public, stating, "In the first episode, Nurse Jackie is introduced as a substance abuser who trades sex with a pharmacist for prescription drugs ... She has no qualms about repeatedly violating the nursing Code of Ethics."

Genre
On August 29, 2010, at the 62nd Primetime Emmy Awards, in her acceptance speech for the Primetime Emmy Award for Outstanding Lead Actress in a Comedy Series, Falco exclaimed "I'm not funny!" Later, while speaking to the press, she expanded upon her statement and said that she felt her performance was dramatic. Several articles have since been written addressing this question, with some writers even calling for an overhaul of the Emmy categorization process as well as a "Comedy-Drama/Dramedy" category for the awards.EMMYS: Do We Need A Dramedy Category? . Deadline.com. Retrieved on 2012-10-09.

Awards and nominationsGolden Globe Awards 2015: Nomination for Best Actress in a Television Series – Musical or Comedy (Edie Falco)
 2014: Nomination for Best Actress in a Television Series – Musical or Comedy (Edie Falco)
 2011: Nomination for Best Television Series – Musical or Comedy
 2011: Nomination for Best Actress in a Television Series – Musical or Comedy (Edie Falco)
 2010: Nomination for Best Actress in a Television Series – Musical or Comedy (Edie Falco)Screen Actors Guild Awards 2013: Nomination for Outstanding Performance by an Ensemble in a Comedy Series
 2013: Nomination for Outstanding Performance by a Female Actor in a Comedy Series (Edie Falco)
 2012: Nomination for Outstanding Performance by a Female Actor in a Comedy Series (Edie Falco)
 2011: Nomination for Outstanding Performance by a Female Actor in a Comedy Series (Edie Falco)
 2010: Nomination for Outstanding Performance by a Female Actor in a Comedy Series (Edie Falco)Primetime Emmy Awards 2015: Nomination for Outstanding Lead Actress in a Comedy Series (Edie Falco)
 2014: Nomination for Outstanding Lead Actress in a Comedy Series (Edie Falco)
 2014: Won for Outstanding Sound Mixing for a Comedy or Drama Series (Half-Hour) and Animation – "The Lady With The Lamp"
 2013: Nomination for Outstanding Lead Actress in a Comedy Series (Edie Falco)
 2013: Won for Outstanding Supporting Actress in a Comedy Series (Merritt Wever)
 2013: Nomination for Outstanding Guest Actor in a Comedy Series (Bobby Cannavale) – "Walk of Shame"
 2013: Nomination for Outstanding Casting for a Comedy Series
 2013: Won for Outstanding Sound Mixing for a Comedy or Drama Series (Half-Hour) and Animation – "Teachable Moments"
 2012: Nomination for Outstanding Lead Actress in a Comedy Series (Edie Falco)
 2012: Nomination for Outstanding Supporting Actress in a Comedy Series (Merritt Wever)
 2012: Nomination for Outstanding Guest Actor in a Comedy Series (Bobby Cannavale) – "Disneyland Sucks"
 2012: Nomination for Outstanding Casting for a Comedy Series
 2012: Nomination for Outstanding Sound Mixing for a Comedy or Drama Series (Half-Hour) and Animation – "Handle Your Scandal"
 2011: Nomination for Outstanding Lead Actress in a Comedy Series (Edie Falco)
 2011: Nomination for Outstanding Casting for a Comedy Series
 2010: Nomination for Outstanding Comedy Series
 2010: Won for Outstanding Lead Actress in a Comedy Series (Edie Falco)
 2010: Nomination for Outstanding Guest Actor in a Comedy Series (Eli Wallach) – "Chicken Soup"
 2010: Nomination for Outstanding Directing for a Comedy Series (Allen Coulter) – "Pilot"
 2010: Nomination for Outstanding Casting for a Comedy Series
 2010: Nomination for Outstanding Cinematography for a Half-Hour Series – "Apple Bong"
 2010: Nomination for Outstanding Main Title Design
 2010: Won for Outstanding Original Main Title Theme Music

Broadcast

Home media

Foreign versions
 The Netherlands: Charlie': A Dutch remake of Nurse Jackie began production for Dutch TV Network, Nederland 3. Starring Halina Reijn, Katja Schuurman, and Benja Bruijning, the show began airing on March 13, 2013.

References

External links
 

2009 American television series debuts
2015 American television series endings
2000s American black comedy television series
2010s American black comedy television series
2000s American comedy-drama television series
2010s American comedy-drama television series
2000s American medical television series
2010s American medical television series
2010s American LGBT-related drama television series
Showtime (TV network) original programming
Primetime Emmy Award-winning television series
Television shows filmed in New York (state)
Television shows set in New York City
English-language television shows
Fictional nurses
Fictional painkiller addicts
Works about nursing
Lesbian-related television shows
Television shows about drugs
Television series created by Linda Wallem
Television series by CBS Studios
Television series by Lionsgate Television